Pachala Someswara Temple is a Saivite Hindu temple located in Panagal of Nalgonda district, Telangana, India. It is a popular pilgrimage site during Maha Sivaratri. The idol of the deity here is carved out of green onyx which gives the temple its name - Pacha in Telugu means Green. The temple is in close proximity to Chaya Someswara Temple, another Saivite shrine in Panagal. The temples dates to 11th to 12th centuries CE and was probably built during the rule of Kunduru Chodas and Prataparudra I of Kakatiya Empire over the Panagal region.

Location 
The temple is located at a distance of nearly 4 km from the district headquarters of Nalgonda in Panagal, Nalgonda district. The temple is in close proximity (around 1 km) to the Chaya Someswara Temple.

Architecture 

Based on the inscriptional evidence and architectural style of the temple, it is dated to the 11th-12th century CE. The temple was probably built during the rule of Kanduru Chodas and Prataparudra I of Kakatiya Empire over the Panagal region. The ground plan of the temple is markedly different from other shrines in Telangana. It has four shrines and three of the shrines are arranged on the western side while one is on the eastern side with a common and large rectangular mandapam. The main shrine is dedicated to Shiva who is in the form of a Linga made out of green onyx stone (Pacha in Telugu) and hence the name Pachala Someswara. It has a pillared hall at the end of which is a Nandi facing the presiding deity Pachala Someswara (Siva linga).

The temple has 70 pillars with intricate carvings depicting stories of Vishnu and Shiva. Scenes from the Ramayana and Mahabaratha were exquisitely carved onto the pillars and the walls of the temple. One of the temple legends states that just below the shining lingam in the temple there used to be a very big and brilliant emerald which was stolen during the numerous Islamic raids in the region.

Museum 
Panagal museum, an archaeological museum was established in the premises of the temple in February 1982. Spread over three acres, it has a collection of around 640 art objects and antiquities. The museum also has statues and sculptures of various Hindu deities dating back to the Andhra Ikshvaku dynasty of 3rd century CE.

Gallery

References

Hindu temples in Nalgonda district
Nalgonda district
Tourist attractions in Nalgonda district
Shiva temples in Telangana
Hindu temples in Telangana